The Oxford-Weidenfeld Translation Prize is an annual literary prize for any book-length translation into English from any other living European language. The first prize was awarded in 1999. The prize is funded by and named in honour of Lord Weidenfeld and by New College, The Queen's College and St Anne's College, Oxford.

Winners
Source:

Shortlists

2007
 Joel Agee for Friedrich Durrenmatt, Selected Writings (University of Chicago Press)
 Anthea Bell for Eva Menasse, Vienna (Weidenfeld and Nicolson)
 Robin Kirkpatrick for Dante, Inferno (Penguin)
 Sverre Lyngstad for Dag Solstad, Shyness and Dignity (Harvill Secker)
 Sandra Smith for Irène Némirovsky, Suite française (Chatto and Windus)

2008
 Richard Dove for Friederike Mayröcker, Raving Language: Selected Poems 1946-2006 (Carcanet)
 Jamie McKendrick for Giorgio Bassani, The Garden of the Finzi-Continis (Penguin)
 Mike Mitchell for Georges Rodenbach, The Bells of Bruges (Dedalus)
 Natasha Randall for Yevgeny Zamyatin, We (Vintage)
 Ina Rilke for Willem Frederik Hermans, The Darkroom of Damocles (Harvill Secker)

2009
 David Colmer for Gerbrand Bakker, The Twin
 Sarah Death for Alexander Ahndoril, The Director
 Christine Donougher for Sylvie Germain, Magnus
 Michael Hofmann for Fred Wander, The Seventh Well
 Marek Tomin for Emil Hakl, Of Kids and Parents

2010
 Susan Wicks for Valérie Rouzeau, Cold Spring in Winter (Arc)
 Larisa Gureyeva & George Hyde for Vladimir Mayakovsky, Pro Eto – That’s What (Arc)
 Howard Curtis for Gustave Flaubert, Three Tales (Hesperus Press)
 Lazer Lederhendler for Nicolas Dickner, Nikolski (Portobello Books)
 Sam Garrett for Tommy Wieringa, Joe Speedboat (Portobello Books)

2011
 Anne McLean for Juan Gabriel Vásquez, The Secret History of Costaguana (Bloomsbury)
 Christopher Middleton for Jean Follain, 130 Poems (Anvil Press)
 Robert and Elizabeth Chandler, with Anna Aslanyan for Vasily Grossman, Everything Flows (Harvill Secker)
 Tom Geddes for Per Wästberg, The Journey of Anders Sparrman (Granta)
 Hugh Rorrison and Helen Chambers for Theodor Fontane, No Way Back (Angel Books)

2012
 John Ashbery for Arthur Rimbaud, Illuminations (Carcanet)
 Margaret Jull Costa for Bernardo Atxaga, Seven Houses in France (Harvill Secker)
 Howard Curtis for Filippo Bologna, How I Lost the War (Pushkin)
 Rosalind Harvey for Juan Pablo Villalobos, Down the Rabbit Hole (And Other Stories)
 Martin McLaughlin for Italo Calvino, Into the War (Penguin)

2013
 Tess Lewis for Lukas Bärfuss, One Hundred Days (Granta)
 Louise B. Popkin for Mario Benedetti, Witness (White Pine Press)
 Sam Taylor for Laurent Binet, HHhH (Harvill Secker)
 Frank Wynne for Alonso Cueto, The Blue Hour (Heinemann)
 Mike Mitchell for Jean-Pierre Ohl, The Lairds of Cromarty (Dedalus)

2014
 Anthea Bell for Eugen Ruge, In Times of Fading Light (Faber)
 Isabel Fargo Cole for Franz Fühmann, The Jew Car (Seagull Books)
 David Homel for Dany Laferrière, The Enigma of the Return (MacLehose Press)
 Peter Daniels for Vladislav Khodasevich, Selected Poems (Angel Classics)
 Alastair McEwen for Andrea Bajani, Every Promise (Maclehose Press)
 Edward Gauvin for Jean Ferry, The Conductor and Other Tales (Wakefield Press)
 Mira Rosenthal for Tomasz Różycki, Colonies (Zephyr Press)

2015
 Nick Caistor and Lorenza Garcia for Andrés Neuman, Talking to Ourselves (Pushkin Press)
 Euan Cameron for Jean-Michel Guenassia, The Incorrigible Optimists Club (Atlantic Books)
 Will Firth for Aleksandar Gatalica, The Great War (Istros Books)
 Anne Stokes for Sarah Kirsch, Ice Roses (Carcanet Press)
 Geoffrey Strachan for Jérôme Ferrari, The Sermon on the Fall of Rome (MacLehose Press)
 Stefan Tobler for Clarice Lispector, Água Viva (Penguin Books)
 Paul Vincent for Erwin Mortier, While the Gods were Sleeping (Pushkin Press)

2016
 John Cullen for Kamel Daoud, The Meursault Investigation (Oneworld)
 Stephen Pearl  for Ivan Goncharov,  The Same Old Story (Alma Classics)               
 Don Bartlett  for Karl Ove Knausgaard, Dancing in the Dark: My Struggle (Harvill Secker)
 Shaun Whiteside for  Charles Lewinsky, Melnitz (Atlantic Books)
 Lola M. Rogers  for Sofi Oksanen, When the Doves Disappeared (Atlantic Books)
 Lisa C. Hayden for Eugene Vodolazkin, Laurus (Oneworld)

2017
 Ben Faccini for Lydie Salvayre, Cry, Mother Spain (MacLehose)
 Philip Ó Ceallaigh for Mihail Sebastian, For Two Thousand Years (Penguin Classics)
 Natasha Wimmer for Álvaro Enrigue, Sudden Death (Harvill Secker)
 Lisa Dillman for Yuri Herrera, The Transmigration of Bodies (And Other Stories)
 Lisa C. Hayden for Vadim Levental, Masha Regina (Oneworld)
 Rawley Grau for Dušan Šarotar, Panorama (Peter Owen World Series/Istros Books)
 Arthur Goldhammer for Stéphane Heuet’s adaptation of Marcel Proust, In Search of Lost Time: Swann’s Way (Gallic)

2018
 Misha Hoekstra for Dorthe Nors, Mirror, Shoulder, Signal (Pushkin Press)
 Susan Bernofsky for Yoko Tawada, Memoirs of a Polar Bear (Portobello Books)
 Forrest Gander for Pablo Neruda, Then Come Back: The Lost Neruda Poems (Bloodaxe Books)
 Helen Constantine for Émile Zola, A Love Story (Oxford University Press)
 Laura Marris for Louis Guilloux, Blood Dark (New York Review Books)
 Michael Lucey for Édouard Louis, The End of Eddy (Harvill Secker)
 Celia Hawkesworth for Daša Drndić, Belladonna (MacLehose Press)

2019
 Philip Roughton - Jón Kalman Stefánsson, About the Size of the Universe, translated from the Icelandic (MacLehose)
 Bryan Karetnyk - Gaito Gazdanov, The Beggar and Other Stories, translated from the Russian (Pushkin Press)
 Delija Valiukenas - Dalia Grinkevičiūtė, Shadows on the Tundra, translated from the Lithuanian (Peirene)
 Ken Cockburn - Christine Marendon, Heroines from Abroad, translated from the German (Carcanet)
 Nick Caistor - Mario Benedetti, Springtime in a Broken Mirror, translated from the Spanish (Penguin)
 Rosie Hedger - Gine Cornelia Pedersen, Zero, translated from the Norwegian (Nordisk Books)
 Rachael McGill - Mbarek Ould Beyrouk, The Desert and the Drum, translated from the French (Dedalus)

2020
 Michális Ganás, A Greek Ballad (Yale UP), translated from the Greek by David Connolly and Joshua Barley
 Mahir Guven, Older Brother (Europa), translated from the French by Tina Kover
 Tatyana Tolstaya, Aetherial Worlds (Daunt Books), translated from the Russian by Anya Migdal
 Multatuli, Max Havelaar (New York Review Books), translated from the Dutch by Ina Rilke and David McKay
 Dušan Šarotar, Billiards at the Hotel Dobray (Istros Books), translated from the Slovene by Rawley Grau
 Dina Salústio, The Madwoman of Serrano (Dedalus), translated from the Portuguese by Jethro Soutar
 Birgit Vanderbeke, You Would Have Missed Me (Peirene Press), translated from the German by Jamie Bulloch

2021
 Vénus Khoury-Ghata, The Last Days of Mandelstam, translated from French by Teresa Lavender Fagan (Seagull)
 Marieke Lucas Rijneveld, The Discomfort of Evening, translated from Dutch by Michele Hutchison (Faber)
 Ulrike Almut Sandig, I Am a Field Full of Rapeseed, Give Cover to Deer and Shine Like Thirteen Oil Paintings Laid One on Top of the Other, translated from German by Karen Leeder (Seagull)
 Guadalupe Nettel, Bezoar, translated from Spanish by Suzanne Jill Levine (Seven Stories Press UK)
 David Diop, At Night All Blood Is Black, translated from French by Anna Moschovakis (Pushkin)
 Esther Kinsky, Grove, translated from German by Caroline Schmidt (Fitzcarraldo)
 Graciliano Ramos, São Bernardo, translated from Portuguese by Padma Viswanathan (NYRB)

2022
 Stuart Bell's translation of Bird Me by Édith Azam – French, the87 press 
 Jen Calleja's translation of The Liquid Land by Raphaela Edelbauer – German, Scribe 
 Sasha Dugdale's translation of In Memory of Memory by Maria Stepanova – Russian, Fitzcarraldo 
 Daniel Hahn's translation of Occupation by Julian Fuks – Portuguese (Brazil), Charco Press 
 Rachael McGill's translation of Co-Wives, Co-Widows by Adrienne Yabouza – French/Sangho (CAR), Dedalus 
 Tiago Miller's translation of The Song of Youth by Montserrat Roig – Catalan, Fum D’Estampa Press 
 Cristina Sandu's translation of Union of Synchronised Swimmers by Cristina Sandu – Finnish, Scribe

Longlist
 Bernard Adams's translation of The Hangman's House by Andrea Tompa - Hungarian, Seagull Books. 
 Jack Bevan's translation of the Complete Poems of Salvatore Quasimodo - Italian, Carcanet 
 Alexandra Büchler's translation of Dream of a Journey by Kateřina Rudčenková – Czech, Parthian 
 John Litell's translation of Nordic Fauna by Andrea Lundgren – Swedish, Peirene 
 Janet Livingstone's translation of Boat Number Five by Monika Kompaníková – Slovak, Seagull Books 
 Julia Sanches's translation of Permafrost by Eva Baltasar – Catalan, And Other Stories 
 Damion Searls's translation of A New Name by Jon Fosse – Norwegian, Fitzcarraldo 
 Jeffrey Zuckerman's translation of Night As It Falls by Jakuta Alikavazovic – French, Faber

Notes

External links
Oxford-Weidenfeld Translation Prize

Translation awards
Awards established in 1999
1999 establishments in the United Kingdom
English literary awards
Awards and prizes of the University of Oxford